Ammannsville is an unincorporated community in southeastern Fayette County, Texas, United States.

References

Unincorporated communities in Fayette County, Texas
Unincorporated communities in Texas